Mohan Kumar Mangalam Stadium is a sports stadium located in Bokaro Steel City, Jharkhand, India. The stadium is situated in heart of the city, in sector 4. The stadium is managed by Bokaro Steel Plant and hosts sporting events in city. The capacity of the stadium is 30,000 with a corporate gallery for VIPs. The stadium hosts National and State football leagues. It has an athletics track. Jharkhand FC will host I-League 2nd Division games.

The stadium is the headquarters of SAIL Football Academy. The SAIL Football Academy students' team has three Subroto Cups to its credit.

See also 

 Senapati Cricket Stadium

References 

Bokaro Steel City
Cricket grounds in Jharkhand
Sports venues in Jharkhand
Multi-purpose stadiums in India
Year of establishment missing